The National Farmers Market Association (NFMA) is a nationwide, nonprofit organization created to promote access to fresh food for people across all economic and social barriers, and to educate individuals, communities, food producers and creative artisans about the impact that available and affordable fresh food can have on health and quality of life.

Overview
While the NFMA promotes health and quality of life around farmers markets, it does not seek to compete with grocery stores or supermarkets. The organization recognizes the inherent value in the farmers market as a resource for making connections within a community, especially in areas of the country where grocery stores and supermarkets are not present.

The NFMA operates within a local area by recruiting volunteers that reach out to educate community members, connect people to farmers markets, and help food desert communities learn how to get Farmers Markets into their areas. Food deserts are areas where fresh, quality food is too far to reach or not affordable.

History
The National Farmers Market Association was conceived as a program by a former Meals on Wheels executive director who saw in the communities his organization served a general lack of knowledge about nutrition and the benefits of fresh fruits and vegetables. The group he created that began the NFMA also saw how farmers' markets became a center for people not just to shop, but to connect with each other, for public service organizations to conduct outreach, for artists and musicians to express their talent and be seen.

Community benefits of the NFMA 
The National Farmer's Market Association (NFMA) benefits a community in several ways, including education and economy. An NFMA chapter works to assist local farmers in bringing their products directly to the consumers. The establishment of an NFMA chapter within the local neighborhood centers buying power and education around the local area, creating a bond between local farmers and their communities. Also, in a purchase from an NFMA farmers market, the money stays in a local area, rather than going to growers around the world.

See also 

 Food desert
 Farmers market
 Community-supported agriculture
 Fresh foods
 Farmers Market (Los Angeles)
 Public market
 Street food
 Street market
 Wet market
 Farmers

References

Further reading
Chitnis, Christine: Markets of New England, 2011. Print

External links
USDA Statistics
National Farmers Market Association
Public Health Grand Rounds

Non-profit organizations based in the United States